Ernstbach is a -long river of Hesse, Germany. It is a left tributary of the Wisper River in the Taunus mountains, part of the Rhine river system.

See also

List of rivers of Hesse

References

Rivers of Hesse
Rheingau-Taunus-Kreis
Rivers of the Taunus
Rivers of Germany
Rheingau